This is a list of the Colombia Olympic football team results since its first match in 1950.

Matches

Amateur era

1950

1951

1954

1959

1961

1964

1967

1968

1970

1971

1972

1973

1976

1978

1980

1981

1984

1986

1987

Professional era

1992

1994

1995

1996

1999

2000

2003

2004

2015

2016

2019

2020

Notes

References

Olympic